, alternatively titled "The Blessing" in English, is a song recorded by Japanese duo Yoasobi. It was released digitally on October 1, 2022, and as a CD single on November 9, through Sony Music Entertainment Japan. The song serves as the opening theme of the 2022 Japanese mecha anime series Mobile Suit Gundam: The Witch from Mercury. 

The song was based on the anime writer Ichirō Ōkouchi's novel Yurikago no Hoshi, depicting the perspective of XVX-016 Gundam Aerial to the protagonist Suletta Mercury. Commercially, "Shukufuku" reached number three on the Oricon Singles Chart and Combined Singles Chart, and number two on the Billboard Japan Hot 100, and was certified gold for download and streaming by the Recording Industry Association of Japan.

Background and release

Starting on September 2, 2022, Yoasobi uploaded three mysterious images of the unknown black shape with a white background featuring the text "941", "730", and "Coming Soon!!!" for three days. On September 4, the second promotional video of the 2022 Japanese mecha anime series Mobile Suit Gundam: The Witch from Mercury was released, announcing that Yoasobi would be handling its opening theme, titled "Shukufuku". The story was published on the anime's official website on October 2.

The "anime edit" version of "Shukufuku" was revealed on September 16 on the special radio show All Night Nippon Music Week, which the duo hosted for one night only to commemorate the 55th anniversary of All Night Nippon. The digital cover artwork was unveiled on September 25. The song was available for digital music and streaming platforms on October 1, a day before the anime's first episode premiere. The music video, directed by Nobutaka Yoda (10Gauge) with animation direction by Yutaro Kubo, premiered via the duo's YouTube channel the next day. It portrays the same visuals as the anime but is "warmer" than the main theme. 

A limited CD single of "Shukufuku" was subsequently issued on December 9, including the English version titled "The Blessing", the "anime edit" version, and the instrumental version, its based novel, original Gunpla Demi-Trainer, and XVX-016 Gundam Aerial decal in an exclusive collaboration with the duo. Yoasobi shared the snippet of the song recorded the English on November 3 after the music video surpassed 10 million views. The English version was released digitally as a standalone single on the same day as the CD single, and included on the duo's second English-language extended play E-Side 2, released on November 18.

Composition and reception

"Shukufuku" is a electropop and dance-pop song with "catchy" melodies and "throbbing" beats, written and produced by Ayase, a duo member. It depicts the relationship between the main protagonist Suletta Mercury and her XVX-016 Gundam Aerial, narrated from the perspective of the Gundam, fighting alongside their host and watching her lead-up to the events of the anime and reminding "the adherence to and liberation from oppression." It was composed in the key of E minor, 170 beats per minute with a running time of three minutes and 16 seconds.

Real Sounds critic Tsuki no Hito described the composition of "Shukufuku" that "the piano sound is gorgeous, and the arrangement is full of sprinting, but the uneasiness hidden throughout the phrase has a thrilling feel suitable for Gundam works with many battle scenes," while said that "the sound image [of "Shukufuku"] coexists suppleness, beauty, and strength, highlighting the world view of Mobile Suit Gundam: The Witch from Mercury while vividly demonstrating Yoasobi's innovation." Nahda Nabiilah from Game Rant praised the song as "providing an upbeat tune that can raise the listener's energy and build up their enthusiasm to start the anime episodes." Writing for Rockin'On Japan, Fumiaki Amano compared "Shukufuku" that "may be as close as possible to what lies between Ayase and Ikura", likening "Yoasobi's theme song".

Commercial performance

With two day of tracking, "Shukufuku" debuted at number 14 on the Billboard Japan Hot 100 in the chart issue dated October 5, 2022, with 23,298 downloads, charted on the Download Songs at number two. The next week, the song surged up 12 spots to number two after its first full week of tracking, behind SKE48's "Zettai Inspiration". It earned 30,499 downloads, atop the Download Songs; 6,203,733 streams, debuted at number seven on the Streaming Songs; and 1,397,032 video views. For the specific-genre Hot Animation chart, "Shukufuku" debuted at number seven and ascended to number one the following week. Upon the CD single release, Billboard Japan reported that "Shukufuku" sold 24,926 copies for its first week, debuted at number four on the Top Singles Sales chart.

For Oricon charts, "Shukufuku" entered the Combined Singles Chart issue dated October 10 at number 23, and ascended to number three the following week. The song debuted at number two on the Digital Singles Chart, selling 26,736 units. Then, it peaked atop the chart issue dated October 17 with 34,563 units, becoming the tenth number-one song on the chart. The single also peaked at number six on the Streaming Chart issue dated October 17, collected 6,390,883 streams. Following the release of its CD single, "Shukufuku" landed at number three on the Oricon Singles Chart and number one on the Anime Singles Chart of November 21 with 23,845 CD sales. Internationally, the song debuted at number 76, 27, and 12 on the Billboard Global 200, Global Excl. U.S, and Hits of the World's Hong Kong Songs, respectively. "Shukufuku" certified gold for download figures by the Recording Industry Association of Japan (RIAJ) on November 18, and streaming on January 30.

Live performances

Yoasobi gave a debut performance of "Shukufuku" at the two-hour special edition of CDTV Live! Live! on November 7, 2022, shot at Gundam Factory Yokohama. The members and the band performed in front of an 18-meter life-size movable Gundam statue. The performance video uploaded via the duo's YouTube channel later on November 27.

Track listing
 Digital download / streaming
  – 3:16

 Digital download / streaming (English version)
 "The Blessing" (English version) – 3:13

 CD single
 "Shukufuku" – 3:14
 "The Blessing" (English version) – 3:14
 "Shukufuku" (anime edit) – 1:30
 "Shukufuku" (instrumental) – 3:12

Credits and personnel
Song
 Ayase – songwriter, producer
 Ikura – vocals
 Takeruru – guitar
 Hikaru Yamamoto – bass
 Ichirō Ōkouchi – based story writer

Music video

 Nobutaka Yoda (10Gauge) – director, storyboard
 Yutaro Kubo – animation director, concept board, animator, photography
 Satomi Maiya – concept board, concept board
 Koshian – art, setting
 Yume Ukai – animator
 Eri Okazaki (Calf) – animator
 Takuto Katayama – animator
 Aya Kondo (Wit Studio) – animator
 Harune Sato – animator, setting
 Jun Takizawa – animator
 Miki Tanaka – animator
 Kanae Miya – animator
 Natsuki Matsuoka – animator
 Kazushige Yusa – animator
 Daisuke Matsuki (10Gauge) – photography
 Atsushi Kobayashi (10Gauge) – photography
 Shinpei Nagashima – 3DCG animator
 Kengo Morita – title logo design
 Kenji Terakawa (10Gauge) – production manager
 Shuma Hirose (10Gauge) – animation producer
 Hiroshi Kobayashi – cooperation
 Takuya Okamoto – cooperation
 Haruna Hayakawa – cooperation
 Sunrise Calf – animation work
 Bandai Namco Filmworks – production

Charts

Weekly charts

Monthly charts

Year-end charts

Certifications

Release history

Notes

References

External links
  
  

2022 singles
2022 songs
Animated series theme songs
Gundam songs
Japanese-language songs
Sony Music Entertainment Japan singles
Yoasobi songs